Bleicher is a German language occupational surname for a bleacher of textiles and may refer to:
Andrea Bleicher (born 1974), Swiss journalist
Hugo Bleicher (1899–1982), German military person of World War I
Willi Bleicher (1907–1981), German trade union leader

References 

German-language surnames
Occupational surnames